In financial trading, a rogue trader is an employee authorized to make trades on behalf of their employer (subject to certain conditions) who makes unauthorized trades. It can also involve mismarking of securities. The perpetrator is a legitimate employee of a company, but enters into transactions on behalf of their employer, or mismarks securities held by their employer, without their employer's permission.

One famous rogue trader is Nick Leeson, whose losses on unauthorized investments in index futures contracts were sufficient to bankrupt his employer Barings Bank in 1995. Through a combination of poor judgment on his part, increasingly large initial profits, lack of oversight by management, a naïve regulatory environment, and an unforeseen outside event, the Kobe earthquake, Leeson incurred a US$1.3 billion loss that bankrupted the centuries-old financial institution. In some cases traders have initially made large profits for their employers, and - their goal - large bonuses for themselves, from trades in breach of applicable laws and company rules, and it has been questioned by some whether in some instances traders are not in fact "rogue", as in those cases in which employers directed the activity or knew of it and turned a blind eye to the transgressions due to the profits involved.

There have been colossal financial losses and bankruptcies from what are considered to be catastrophically bad decisions by senior decision-makers in financial institutions, such as the bankruptcy of Lehman Brothers which necessitated the 2008 United Kingdom bank rescue package, but this is not described as rogue trading and is not punishable.

Largest rogue-trader losses

See also
 List of trading losses
 Oil futures drunk-trading incident
 Product control

References

 
White-collar criminals
Operational risk